Elburn is a station on Metra's Union Pacific West Line located in Elburn, Illinois. The station is the western terminus of the West Line. The station is located at ground level. A large coach yard is located just east of the station. , Elburn is the 137th busiest of the 236 non-downtown stations in the Metra system, with an average of 336 weekday boardings.

As of December 5, 2022, Elburn is served by 48 trains (23 inbound, 25 outbound) on weekdays, by all 10 trains in each direction on Saturdays, and by all nine trains in each direction on Sundays and holidays. All Metra trains that operate this far west originate, or terminate, at Elburn.

The first station in Elburn was established in 1854 with the arrival of the Galena and Chicago Union Railroad. This later merged into the Chicago and North Western Railway (C&NW) and was on the Omaha–Chicago main line. The C&NW eventually merged into the Union Pacific Railroad, the current operator of the line, in 1995.

Transportation
Huskie Bus Line
 Elburn Shuttle
Taxis
 One Choice Cab

References

External links

Metra stations in Illinois
Railway stations in the United States opened in 2006
Transportation buildings and structures in Kane County, Illinois
Former Chicago and North Western Railway stations
Railway stations in the United States opened in 1854
Railway stations closed in 1959
Union Pacific West Line